Wauconda may refer to:

Wauconda, Illinois, a village in Lake County, Illinois, United States with the same name as the fictional nation name of Wakanda spelled differently.
Wauconda Bog Nature Preserve, a tamarack bog and a National Natural Landmark located in Wauconda, Illinois
Wauconda Community Unit School District 118, a school district serving Wauconda, Illinois and surrounding areas
Wauconda Area Library, a library serving Wauconda, Illinois and surrounding areas
Wauconda Township, Lake County, Illinois, a township in Lake County, Illinois, United States, which includes the village of Wauconda
Wauconda, Washington, an unincorporated community in Okanogan County, Washington, United States
Wauconda Pass, a high mountain pass in the Cascades in the state of Washington

See also
 Wakanda (disambiguation)